Habsiyat is a genre in Persian literature that deals with imprisonment. It was formed under the Ghaznavid dynasty (977–1186) and especially thrived under the Shirvanshahs (861–1538). It was created by a poet of the Ghaznavids, Masud Sa'd Salman (died 1121).

References

Sources
 
 

Genres of poetry
Persian literature by genre